Tiflis Geographical Society was a late-19th century, early-20th century geography society in Russia that was associated with progressive, liberal causes.  It was organized in Tbilisi, Russia, but became known in English circles as the "Tiflis Geographical Society."

Activity

General Zelensy, in an 1885 address to the society, mentioned and elaborated on the first railway established to Ashgabat.

Theodor Leonhard Rudolph Freiherr von Ungern-Sternberg, the father of anti-Communist general Roman von Ungern-Sternberg, had worked with the society. From his expedition to Mount Elbrus, he wrote to them: "At the last height we passed through a terrific snowstorm.  Breathing was not attended with any great difficulty.  The health of my men has been good."

In 1913, the anarchist Peter Kropotkin had noted that the society's work with regards to the liberation of slaves in the Caucasus was extraordinary and impressive.

In 1927, it was listed as a noted source for information on "A Record of Mountain Adventure and Scientific Observation."

Work from this society has been reused and republished within academic circles as late as 1985, in regards to its studies of family life in Syria.

References

History of Tbilisi